Abai Region is a region of Kazakhstan. President Kassym-Jomart Tokayev announced on 16 March 2022 that the region would be created. The area split off from East Kazakhstan Region when Tokayev's bill came into force on 8 June 2022. The administrative center of the region is Semey. Its borders roughly correspond to the old Semipalatinsk Region which was liquidated in 1997 and merged with East Kazakhstan Region.

Etymology
Abai Region was named after famous Kazakh aqyn Abai Qunanbaiuly, who was born in what is now the Abai Region.

References

 
2022 establishments in Kazakhstan
States and territories established in 2022